Einar "Pastor'n" Iversen (27 July 1930 – 3 April 2019) was a Norwegian jazz pianist and composer and the son of a "pastor." He went into jazz after World War II ended. For more than sixty years, he played with everyone in Norwegian jazz.

Career 
Iversen was raised in Oslo where he studied classical piano under Inge Rolf Ringnes, Artur Schnabel and Finn Mortensen, and quickly established himself at the Oslo jazz scene (1949). He released his first album with Rowland Greenberg's orchestra (1953), and became one of the most respected Norwegian jazz musicians, awarded Buddyprisen (1958).

He played in a number of theaters, with Dizzy Gillespie at Birdland (1952), on the America Boat with Anthony Ortega (1954) and Modern Jazz Quartet (1955), and was a regular pianist at Metropol Jazz Club, where he played with jazz greats such as Dexter Gordon (1962), Coleman Hawkins (1963), Johnny Griffin (1964), and with Svend Asmussen and Stuff Smith in Sweden 1965. He recorded an album with his own trio (Me and My Piano 1967, reissued 2010). He co-operated with Swedish Putte Wickman and Monica Zetterlund, and Povel Ramel on tour in 1978. In Norway, he participated in a number of releases with Bjarne Nerem, Egil Johansen, Totti Bergh, Nora Brockstedt and Ditlef Eckhoff.

He led his own "E. I. Trio" with Tor Hauge (bass) and Jon Christensen (drums). They released Norway's first jazz trio recording, Me and my piano in 1967, "Ponca Jazz Records" 2005), containing Jazz standards. On "Gemini Records" he released the album Jazz på norsk (1990), Who can I turn to (1991), Portrait of a norwegian jazz artist – Einar Iversen (2001), and Seaview ("Hazel Records", 2001) With Tine Asmundsen (bass) and Svein Christiansen (drums). Iversen's recent works have been published in Twelve compositions ("Norsk jazzforlag", 2005). He died on 3 April 2019, aged 88.

Honors 
Buddyprisen 1958
Knight of First Class of the Order of the St. Olavs
Gammleng-prisen in the class Veterans in 1997

Compositions 
Twelve Compositions, music by Einar Iversen,  ISMN M-706695-05-1

Selected discography

Solo albums 
1967: Me and my piano (Ponca Jazz Records, 2005), "E. I. Trio" including Tor Hauge & Jon Christensen
2001: Seaview (Hazel Records), trio" including Tine Asmundsen & Svein Christiansen
2001: Einar Iversen

Collaborative works 
2007 About Time (Hazel Jazz HJ4), with Lill Holen

References 
Bibliography

Notes

External links 
Tribute to the 75th anniversary written by Bjørn Stendahl at Ny Tid
Einar "Pastor'n" Iversen on YouTube
Einar Iversen, Part 1 of 3 on YouTube

1930 births
2019 deaths
20th-century Norwegian pianists
21st-century Norwegian pianists
Norwegian jazz pianists
Norwegian jazz composers
Male jazz composers
People from Mandal, Norway
Ponca Jazz Records artists
Gemini Records artists
Musicians from Oslo
Norwegian male pianists
20th-century Norwegian male musicians
21st-century Norwegian male musicians